Lacanobia grandis, the grand arches moth, is a species of cutworm or dart moth in the family Noctuidae.

The MONA or Hodges number for Lacanobia grandis is 10300.

References

Further reading

 
 
 

Lacanobia
Articles created by Qbugbot
Moths described in 1852